Mário Jorge Ferreira da Silva (born 8 February 1983), better known as Marinho Silva, is a Portuguese footballer. He plays defense. His height is 170 cm and he weighs in at 70 kg.

Career

1996/97 INI Barreirense
2003/04 Portugal 1º de Maio Sarilhense 
2004/05 III CD Montijo
2005/06 IIH Barreirense	
2006/07 IIB+ Portugal Barreirense	
2006/07 III Portugal Montijo
2007/08 III Portugal Amora	
2008/09 II Romania FCM Dunarea Galati
2009/10 IIB+ Portugal Eléctrico
2010/11 IIB+ Portugal Praiense
2011/12 Angola Girabola
2011/12 I Recreativo Caála

References

1983 births
Living people
Portuguese footballers
Académica Petróleos do Lobito players
C.R. Caála players
S.C. Praiense players
Girabola players
Expatriate footballers in Angola

Association football fullbacks